Graciliscincus is a lizard genus in the family Scincidae. The genus is indigenous to New Caledonia.

Species and geographic range
The genus Graciliscincus contains the single species Graciliscincus shonae, known commonly as Sadlier's skink or the gracile burrowing skink.

Geographic range
G. shonae is endemic to New Caledonia.

Habitat

Etymology
The specific name, shonae, is in honor of Shona von Sturmer Sadlier, who was the wife of the describer.

Conservation status
G. shonae is threatened by habitat loss and fragmentation.

References

Further reading
Adler GH, Austin CC, Dudley R (1995). "Dispersal and speciation of skinks among archipelagos in the tropical Pacific Ocean". Evolutionary Ecology 9: 529–541.
Sadlier RA (1987). "A review of the scincid lizards of New Caledonia". Records of the Australian Museum 39 (1): 1-66. (Gentiliscincus, new genus, p. 12; G. shonae, new species, p. 12).

External links

Skinks
Skinks of New Caledonia
Endemic fauna of New Caledonia
Monotypic lizard genera
Taxa named by Ross Allen Sadlier